The Diocese of Madras is one of the 30 dioceses of the Indian Orthodox Church with its headquarters at Chennai .

History
H.G Kayalath Dr. Stephanos Mar Theodosius was the first Diocesan Metropolitan. He became the Metropolitan of the newly formed Calcutta diocese in 1979 which was bifurcated from the diocese.

Today
The present diocese was formed on 1979 and the Diocesan Metropolitan was the late H.G. Zachariah Mar Dionysius. Diocese of Madras includes the territorial area of Tamil Nadu, and Andaman islands in India, Australia, New Zealand, Malaysia, Singapore and churches in other countries.

Since the demise of H.G. Mar Dionysius in 1997, H.G. Dr. Yakob Mar Irenaios Metropolitan led the diocese. The Diocese celebrated its Silver Jubilee in 2004 and launched several charitable and social development programmes. Territorial and institutional growth caused the Diocese to be divided into three Madras, Bangalore and Brahmavar Dioceses. The diocese has 64 independent parishes and many more congregations including 9 cathedrals. Sixty-five priests serve the parishioners, including 6 Cor-episcopas, 1 Cor-episcopa ramban, 4 rambans, and 4 retirees.

The diocese has a charitable institution called Snehabhavan, which is a guidance centre for patients undergoing treatment in Christian Medical College, Vellore.

Mercy Home is a home for physically challenged children in Eluru, Andhra Pradesh. Almost all parishes operate elementary and higher secondary schools. One degree college operates in Narasimharajapuram, South canara, and two colleges run under control of the parishes. They are St.Mary’s college, Brahmavar and St. Thomas College, Koyambedu, Chennai.

This diocese includes non-Malayalee communities consisting of Konkani Christians with Konkani Priests, worshiping in Konkani language in Brahmavar. Another community of Telugu inhabits Eluru with Telugu Evangelists. The diocese also runs 2 guesthouses in Chennai city for youngsters who came to study as well as work.

Diocesan Metropolitan

List of parishes in India
 St. Mary's Orthodox Cathedral, Port Blair, Andamans, India
 St. Thomas Orthodox Church, Bettapur, Andamans, India
 St. Mary's Orthodox Church, Diglipur, Andamans, India
 St. Gregorios Orthodox Church, Mannarghat, Andamans, India
 St. George Orthodox Church, Mayabunder, Andamans, India
 St. Gregorios Orthodox Church, Rangat, Andamans, India
 St. Dionysius Orthodox Church, Kadamthala, Andamans, India
 St. Mary's Orthodox Cathedral, Coimbatore, India
 St. Mary's Orthodox Church, Coonoor, India
 St. George Orthodox Church, Avadi, Chennai, India
 St. George Orthodox Church, Ramalingapuram, Chennai, India
 St. Thomas Orthodox Cathedral, Broadway, Chennai, India
 St. Mary's Orthodox Church, Chetpet, Chennai, India
 St. Mary's Orthodox Church, Injambakkam, Chennai, India
 St. Peter's & St. Paul's Orthodox Church, Koyembedu, Chennai, India
 St. George Orthodox Church, Padi, Chennai, India
 St. Gregorios Orthodox Church, Perambur, Chennai, India
 St. Thomas Mount Orthodox Church, Puzhuthivakkam, Chennai, India
 Mar Gregorios Orthodox Church, Tambaram, Chennai, India
 St. Mary's Orthodox Church, Tiruvottiyur, Chennai, India
 St. Thomas Orthodox Church, Madurai, India
 St. Gregorios Orthodox Church, Mettupalayam, India
 St. Thomas Orthodox Church, Neyveli, India
 St. Mary's Orthodox Church, Pollachi, India
 St. Antony's Orthodox Church, Pondichery, India
 St. Gregorios Orthodox Church, Salem, India
 St. Mary's Orthodox Church, Tirupur, India
 St. Thomas Orthodox Church, Tiruchirapalli, India
 St. Mary's Orthodox Church, Thiruvarambur, India
 St. Gregorios Orthodox Church, Tuticorin, India
 St. Peter's Orthodox Church, Valparai, India
 St. Luke's Orthodox Church, Vellore, India

List of parishes outside India
 St. Mary's Orthodox Syrian Cathedral, Kuala Lumpur, Malaysia (First Church Outside India)*
 St.Thomas Orthodox Syrian Cathedral, Singapore, Singapore
 St. Dionysius Indian Orthodox Church, Auckland, New Zealand
 St. Gregorios Indian Orthodox Church, Hamilton, New Zealand
 St. Mary's Indian Orthodox Cathedral, Melbourne, Australia https://www.stmarysioc.org.au/
 St. Gregorios Indian Orthodox Church, Melbourne, Australia https://web.sgiocmelbourne.org.au/
 St. George Indian Orthodox Church, Perth, Australia
 St. Gregorios Indian Orthodox Church, Adelaide, Australia
 St. Thomas Indian Orthodox Cathedral, Sydney, Australia
 St. George Indian Orthodox Church, Brisbane, Australia
 St.Peter’s and St.Paul’s Indian Orthodox Church,Brisbane,Australia 
 St. Mary's Indian Orthodox Church, Sydney, Australia   http://smioc.org.au/
 St. Gregorios Indian Orthodox Church, Canberra, Australia

External links
Official website of Malankara Orthodox Church
Official website of Madras Diocese

Malankara Orthodox Syrian Church dioceses
1979 establishments in Tamil Nadu